Last Squad Standing is a competition reality television series that premiered on Oxygen Media where three groups of friends from across America live together and compete in a series of physical challenges for a chance to take home $100,000. Each week, the losing team is forced to determine which members of the squad will be put up for elimination, and members of the winning team then vote for who leaves. At the end of the season, the squad that has the most members remaining earns the grand prize. Among the squads is Ciera Nicole Butts, Miss District of Columbia USA 2014.

References 

2010s American reality television series
2016 American television series debuts
2017 American television series endings
Oxygen (TV channel) original programming